Cristurges bimaculatus is a species of beetle in the family Cerambycidae, the only species in the genus Cristurges.

References

Acanthocinini